Piletocera flavalis is a moth in the family Crambidae. It was described by George Hampson in 1917. It is found in Malawi.

References

flavalis
Moths described in 1917
Taxa named by George Hampson
Moths of Africa